Weapon X is a fictional Canadian covert operations program appearing in books published by Marvel Comics, usually those featuring X-Men or Wolverine, who is its most notable former member.

The roster consists of two parts. The first part lists the characters in nominal positions of control of the program. The second part lists the characters the program has used either as agents, or as experimental subjects.

Weapon X staff
 Ajax (Francis) - A cyborg who was empowered and trained at the Weapon X facility. Former enforcer of Dr. Killebrew. Nearly killed in the past by Deadpool but recovered and slaughtered other survivors of Weapon X to track down Deadpool. Apparently killed by Deadpool.
 The Director (Malcolm Colcord) - Scarred by Wolverine. Current whereabouts unknown.
 Dr. Abraham Cornelius - Currently deceased
 Dr. Duncan - Current whereabouts unknown
 Dr. Carol Hines - In charge of monitoring and recording the Adamantium bonding process. Killed by Aldo Ferro
 Brent Jackson - Former S.H.I.E.L.D. Defected to Weapon X and eventually became Director. Current whereabouts unknown.
 Madison Jeffries - Former member of Alpha Flight, Gamma Flight and the Zodiac, was brainwashed by the Weapon X. Retained his superhuman powers after the M-Day event. Currently a member of the "X-Club", started by Beast to try to solve the mystery of M-Day.
 Dr. Killebrew - A geneticist. He mutated many of the subjects including Deadpool. Former commander of Ajax who would later kill him.
 Dr. Cecilia Reyes  - member of the X-Men forced to work for Weapon X.
 Professor (Thorton) - Directed the bonding of Adamantium to Wolverine who later would cut his hand off. He was later killed by Silver Fox
 John Sublime - Current whereabouts and status unknown
 Robert Windsor (Mr Sinister) - A guise taken by Mister Sinister. Currently active as Miss Sinister.
 Dr. Zira
 Dr. Dale Rice - A scientist who is the father of Dr. Zander Rice. He was killed by a fleeing Wolverine.
 William Stryker - The director of the Weapon X Project at the time when they started working on an experiment where they turned their subjects into Hulk/Wolverine hybrids.
 Dr. Aliana Alba - A scientist working under William Stryker.
 Romulus: Current status unknown.

Weapon X agents and test subjects
 James "Logan" Howlett / Weapon X / Wolverine - Concurrent member of Alpha Flight. Later member of X-Men, Fantastic Four, the Secret Defenders and the New Avengers. The Weapon X Project bonded Adamantium to his bones.
 Kayla / Silver Fox - She later became an agent of HYDRA. Currently deceased.
 Jack Mead / Jack-in-the-Box - Current whereabouts and status unknown.
 Native - Currently deceased
 Jeanne-Marie Beaubier / Aurora - Former member of Alpha Flight. She was later member of the 198. Currently with Alpha Flight's space program.
 Jonothon "Jono" Starsmore / Chamber - Former member of Generation X and the X-Men. Depowered after M-Day. Currently a member of the New Mutants.
 Vanessa Carlysle / Copycat - Currently deceased.
 Wade Wilson / Deadpool - Mercenary. He later registered with the Initiative.
 John Wraith / Kestrel - Currently deceased
 Sarah / Marrow - Former member of the Morlocks, Gene Nation and the X-Men and later, X-Cell and X-Force. She was depowered after the M-Day
 David North / Agent Zero - Depowered after the M-Day
 Mastodon - Currently deceased.
 Vincent / Mesmero - He was depowered after the M-Day
 Pantu Hurageb / Reaper - Former member of the Mutant Liberation Front and X-Cell. Depowered after the M-Day. Repowered by Quicksilver
 Victor Creed / Sabretooth - He was later a member of the Marauders, Brotherhood of Evil Mutants, X-Men and X-Factor. Prisoner in Krakoa.
 Dr. Karl Lykos / Sauron - Former member of the Savage Land Mutates and the Brotherhood of Evil Mutants.
 Gregory "Greg" Terraerton / Slayback - Former member of Department K. Disintegrated by Adam Unit. Returned to kidnap former Weapon X members with healing factors. Blown up when laboratory housing experiments was self-destructed.
 John Lopez / Washout - Currently deceased and remains were taken by Mister Sinister
 Garrison Kane / Weapon X - Currently deceased
 Kyle Gibney / Wild Child - Later and former member of Gamma Flight, Alpha Flight and X-Factor. Depowered after the M-Day
 Richard Gill / Wildside - Former member of the Mutant Liberation Front. He was depowered after the M-Day
 Laura Kinney / X-23 - A genetic clone of Wolverine. She was a later member of the New X-Men and X-Force.
 X-13 - Current status and whereabouts unknown.
 Noel Higgins / Wildcat - Current status and whereabouts unknown.
 Aldo Ferro / Vole - Current status and whereabouts unknown.
 Worm Cunningham — Mercifully killed by Wade Wilson at the Workshop (a hospice center for Weapon X rejects) after Ajax lobotomized him in retribution for Wade's actions.
 Jacques — Killed by Ajax after providing information about Deadpool's location.
 Steve — Killed by Ajax along with Jacques.
 Todd — Tortured and then killed by Ajax after providing information about Deadpool.
 Michelle — Sent to the Workshop due to psychosis from her sensory enhancements. Presumed dead by suicide.
 R. Hoek — Sent to the Workshop due to a strength augmentation mishap that increased his muscle density to be point of being unable to move.  Presumed dead.
 Mauvais
 H-Alpha - Clayton Cortez was a NAVY Seal who was subjected to the Weapon X Project's experiment that involved grafting the DNA of Hulk and Wolverine into him combined with bonding Adamantium to his bones and injecting him from nanites that were harvested from Lady Deathstrike and reverse-engineered. The transformation turned him into a gray-skinned Hulk-like creature with Wolverine-like claws and Adamantium protrusion on his upper arms, shoulders, and lower legs.
 H-Beta - Robert Andrews was a man who was lured into the Weapon X Project's experiments that involved grafting the DNA of Hulk and Wolverine into him combined with bonding Adamantium to his bones. The transformation turned him into a green-skinned Hulk-like creature with gray hair and Wolverine-like claws. He was later beheaded by H-Alpha during his fight with Amadeus Cho's Hulk form.

See also
Weapon Plus

References

Weapon X